Bidens micrantha is a species of flowering plant in the aster family known by the common name grassland beggarticks. It is endemic to the Hawaiian Islands, where it and other Bidens species are known as kōokoolau. It occurs in many types of habitat on Lānai, Maui, and Hawaii, including rocky cliffs, dry forests, mesic forests, wet forests, and high shrublands.

Subspecies
B. m. ssp. micrantha (Maui)
B. m. ssp. ctenophylla (Sherff) Ganders & Nagata (leeward Hualālai on Hawaii)
B. m. ssp. kalealaha Ganders & Nagata (Lānai and West Maui)

While B. m. ssp. micrantha is considered secure, B. m. ssp. ctenophylla is uncommon and vulnerable and 
B. m. ssp. kalealaha is rare and federally listed as an endangered species.
This is a shrub forming clumps of herbage up to several feet tall. It bears plentiful flower heads with yellow ray florets. It is grown as an ornamental plant and groundcover in Hawaii.

This species was used to make leis and was brewed into tea.

References

External links

micrantha
Endemic flora of Hawaii
Biota of Lanai
Biota of Maui
Biota of Hawaii (island)
Plants described in 1827
Flora without expected TNC conservation status